Microsoft Agent was a technology developed by Microsoft which employed animated characters, text-to-speech engines, and speech recognition software to enhance interaction with computer users. Thus it was an example of an embodied agent.  It came preinstalled as part of Windows 98 through Windows Vista. It was not included with Windows 7 but can be downloaded from Microsoft. It was completely discontinued in Windows 8. Microsoft Agent functionality was exposed as an ActiveX control that can be used by web pages.

The theory behind this software came from work on social interfaces by Clifford Nass and Byron Reeves at Stanford's Center for the Study of Language and Information.

Version history
Interactive character technology was first introduced in Microsoft Bob, which used an early version of Agent technology internally referred to as "Microsoft Actor." It was the code used in the initial version of the Office Assistant in Office 97. Microsoft Agent was subsequently created by Tandy Trower in an attempt to offer technology that was more flexible and available to third-party developers to include in their applications and web pages. The software release also included four interactive characters as well as a utility that enables developers to assemble their own characters and interactions. 

Microsoft Agent replaced the original Microsoft Actor code in Office 2000, although this use did not include Agent's much-touted speech synthesis or recognition capabilities or any of the four Microsoft Agent characters. Instead the Office team created their own characters including one dubbed "Clippit" or "Clippy". However, Bob Actors or Office 97 assistants are incompatible with Office 2000 and later versions, and vice versa.

The current version of Microsoft Agent was quietly released on MSDN in 1997.

Technology
Microsoft Agent characters are stored in files of the .ACS extension, and can be stored in a number of compressed .ACF files for better World Wide Web distribution. Microsoft Office 97 and Microsoft Bob Actor characters are stored in files of the .ACT extension. Microsoft Agent character definition files are stored in files of the .ACD file extension, and are generated by the Microsoft Agent Character Editor.

The speech engine itself is driven by the Microsoft Speech API (SAPI), version 4 and above. Microsoft SAPI provides a control panel for easily installing and switching between various available Text to Speech and Speech to Text engines, as well as voice training and scoring systems to improve the quality and accuracy of both engines.

Microsoft provides four agent characters for free, which can be downloaded from the Microsoft Agent website. These are called Peedy, Merlin, Genie, and Robby. Some characters also shipped with Microsoft Office up to version 2003 as the Office Assistants and with Windows XP as search assistants. New Agent characters can also be created using Microsoft's development tools, including the Agent Character Editor. Agents can be embedded in software with Visual Basic for Applications and in web pages with VBScript, and automated tools for the purpose of simplifying this exist. However, web page agents are only compatible with Internet Explorer, since alternative browsers like Opera or Mozilla Firefox do not support ActiveX. Additionally, users of Windows Me, Windows 2000, Windows XP and later or owners of Microsoft Office 2000 and later are the only ones who have Agent software pre-loaded on their computers; others have to download the software and install it manually.

Support after Windows XP
In Windows Vista, Microsoft Agent uses Speech API (SAPI) version 5.3 as its primary text-to-speech provider. (In previous versions of Windows, Agent uses SAPI version 4, which is not supported in Windows Vista and later.) Beginning with Vista, multilingual features of Microsoft Agent under a particular language version of the OS are not supported; that is, Agent will function in other languages only under a localized Windows version of the same language.

Microsoft announced in April 2009 that all Microsoft Agent development and support will be discontinued with the release of Windows 7. Microsoft is no longer offering licenses or distributing the SDK.

However, due to customer feedback, Microsoft has provided an installation package of the Microsoft Agent core components for use on Windows 7. The download supports SAPI 5.3 compatible speech engines, and also contains the character “Merlin”, which shipped with Windows Vista.

See also
 Embodied agent
 BonziBuddy

Microsoft

 Office Assistant
 Microsoft Voice Command
 Cortana
 Microsoft Bob

References

External links
 

Agent
Speech processing software
Windows components
Computer-related introductions in 1995
Products and services discontinued in 2009